Disney Channel Circle of Stars are a music group created by Disney Channel/The Walt Disney Company, that makes cover versions of Disney's songs. They recorded "Circle of Life" in 2003 and "A Dream Is a Wish Your Heart Makes" in 2005. A group of actors and actresses who have appeared in Disney Channel television series and original movies, including Hilary Duff, Raven-Symoné, Orlando Brown, Anneliese van der Pol, and Kyla Pratt, were all part of the original line-up. One or the other of these songs appeared on Disneymania 2, Disneymania 4, DisneyRemixMania, The Lion King Special Edition, and Cinderella Platinum Edition DVD.

Members

Original lineup (2003-2005) 
These are the only actors to appear in both 2003 and 2005.
 Raven-Symoné
 Orlando Brown
 Anneliese van der Pol
 Kyla Pratt

Former
Members of 2003
 Hilary Duff 
 Christy Carlson Romano
 Tahj Mowry
 A. J. Trauth

Members of 2005

 Dylan Sprouse
 Cole Sprouse
 Brenda Song
 Ricky Ullman
 Amy Bruckner
 Alyson Michalka
 Ashley Tisdale

Members of 2014

Sabrina Carpenter
Olivia Holt
Kelli Berglund
Jake Short
Bradley Steven Perry
Kevin Chamberlin
Tyrel Jackson Williams
Austin North
Peyton List
Grace Phipps
Dylan Riley Snyder 
Jordan Fisher
Joey Bragg
Tenzing Norgay Trainor
Karan Brar
Skai Jackson
Rowan Blanchard
Peyton Clark
Leo Howard
Blake Michael
Sarah Gilman
Piper Curda
Leigh-Allyn Baker

Discography

Circle of Life
The lineup for "Circle of Life" included:

 
The song appeared on the following albums:
2004: DisneyMania 2
2004: Radio Disney Jingle Jams
2005: DisneyRemixMania

A Dream Is a Wish Your Heart Makes
The lineup for "A Dream Is a Wish Your Heart Makes" included:

The song appeared on the following albums:
2005: Radio Disney Jingle Jams
2006: Disneymania 4
2008: Princess DisneyMania

Do You Want to Build a Snowman?
On July 20, 2014, a cover version of "Do You Want to Build a Snowman?" from Frozen featuring current members of Disney Circle of Stars was released.

The lineup for "Do You Want to Build a Snowman?" included:

References

Child musical groups
Disney Channel
Circle of Stars
American children's musical groups
American pop music groups
Musical groups established in 2003
Musical groups disestablished in 2005
Walt Disney Records artists